Enders's small-eared shrew (Cryptotis endersi) is a species of mammal in the family Soricidae. It is endemic to Panama.

References

Sources

Cryptotis
Mammals of Central America
Taxonomy articles created by Polbot
Mammals described in 1950